is a Japanese footballer who plays for Sanfrecce Hiroshima and the Japan national team.

Career
Tsukasa Morishima joined J1 League club Sanfrecce Hiroshima in 2016. On May 4, he debuted in AFC Champions League (v FC Seoul).

Club statistics
Updated to 5 November 2022.

1Includes Japanese Super Cup.

National team statistics

Honours

Club
Sanfrecce Hiroshima
 J.League Cup: 2022

References

External links

Profile at Sanfrecce Hiroshima

1997 births
Living people
Association football people from Mie Prefecture
Japanese footballers
J1 League players
Sanfrecce Hiroshima players
Association football midfielders
Japan international footballers